Lierne is a municipality in Trøndelag county, Norway. It is part of the Namdalen region, and it is the largest municipality by area in Trøndelag. The administrative centre of the municipality is the village of Sandvika. Other villages include Inderdal, Mebygda, and Tunnsjø senter. The municipality borders Sweden to the south and east. Most of Lierne lies on the Swedish side of the drainage divide between Norway and Sweden.

The  municipality is the 16th largest by area out of the 356 municipalities in Norway. Lierne is the 310th most populous municipality in Norway with a population of 1,309.

General information

The municipality of Lierne was established on 1 January 1874 when it was separated from the large municipality of Snaasen. Initially, the population of Lierne was 1,015. On 1 July 1915, it was divided into two municipalities: Nordli (population: 863) in the north and Sørli (population: 739) in the south. This division, however, was short-lived. During the 1960s, there were many municipal mergers across Norway due to the work of the Schei Committee. On 1 January 1964 they were merged back together again under the former name Lierne. After the merger, there were 2,045 residents in the new municipality.

On 1 January 2018, the municipality switched from the old Nord-Trøndelag county to the new Trøndelag county.

Name
The municipality (originally the parish) is named after the old name for the region which means "mountainside" (similar to the Norwegian word li). Historically, the prefix Finna- was often added to the name: . Later, the prefix was dropped and the definite plural form of li was used, Lierne. The li name lives on in many places in the municipality such as Nordli and Sørli.

Coat of arms
The coat of arms was granted on 3 February 1984. The official blazon is "Azure, three grouses argent, two over one". This means the arms have a COLOR field (background) and the charge is three Willow Ptarmigans (Lagopus lagopus), a type of local grouse. The ptarmigan design has a tincture of argent which means it is commonly colored white, but if it is made out of metal, then silver is used. This design was chosen because these birds are plentiful in the area. Historically, hunting ptarmigan was of great importance for the survival of the inhabitants during the winters. The bird was thus chosen as a symbol for the municipality. The arms were designed by Einar H. Skjervold.

Churches
The Church of Norway has two parishes within the municipality of Lierne. It is part of the Namdal prosti (deanery) in the Diocese of Nidaros.

Geography

Lierne National Park is located in the municipality, and Blåfjella-Skjækerfjella National Park is partly located in Lierne. Lierne has a significant population of brown bears.

Lierne is also home to many lakes, including Gusvatnet, Havdalsvatnet, Holden, Ingelsvatnet, Kingen, Kvesjøen, Laksjøen, Lenglingen, Limingen, Murusjøen, Rengen, Sandsjøen, Stortissvatnet, Tunnsjøen, and Ulen.

History
Lierne was the largest obstacle in the negotiations before the Stromstad Treaty of 1751 in which the border was defined in detail. Sweden wanted it based on its location on the Eastern side of the drainage divide, although Norway got it based on its connection to the Snaasen parish in Norway, and as compensation Norway gave up its demand for the Idre and Särna parishes which were under Swedish control since 1644. This gave a curve in the border.

Government
All municipalities in Norway, including Lierne, are responsible for primary education (through 10th grade), outpatient health services, senior citizen services, unemployment and other social services, zoning, economic development, and municipal roads. The municipality is governed by a municipal council of elected representatives, which in turn elect a mayor.  The municipality falls under the Trøndelag District Court and the Frostating Court of Appeal.

Municipal council
The municipal council of Lierne is made up of 15 representatives that are elected to four year terms. The party breakdown of the council is as follows:

Mayors
The mayors of Lierne:

1964–1965: Ola H. Kveli (V)
1966–1971: Ragnar Harbækvold (Sp)
1972–1975: Leif Sander Aagård (DLF)
1976–1979: Jon Leon Estil (Sp)
1980–1983: Reidar Kveli (Sp)
1984–1987: Jon Leon Estil (Sp)
1988–1991: Bernt Hågensen (Ap)
1991-1991: Gun Kveli (Ap)
1991–2007: Arnodd Lillemark (Sp)
2007–2015: Alf Robert Arvasli (Ap)
2015–2021: Bente Estil (Ap)
2021–present: Reidar Rødli (Ap)

Notable people 
 Frode Estil (born 1972 in Lierne) a retired Norwegian cross-country skier; he won two golds and a silver medal at the 2002 Winter Olympics and asilver medal in the 2006 Winter Olympics

Attractions
The cross-country race Flyktningerennet is held here every year. It is a race that follows a route from Nordli to Gäddede in Strömsund Municipality, Sweden, in remembrance of the people who fled Nazi German-occupied Norway for Sweden during the Second World War.

References

External links

Municipal fact sheet from Statistics Norway 

 
Municipalities of Trøndelag
1874 establishments in Norway
1915 disestablishments in Norway
1964 establishments in Norway